The Macclesfield group power stations are three relatively small electric power stations at Alderley Edge, Buxton, and Macclesfield, England. They supplied electricity to their respective towns from 1890s to the 1960s. The oil-engine stations were operated by a succession of private and public owners prior to the nationalisation of the British electricity industry in 1948. The power stations were redeveloped as a group in the 1950s as demand for electricity grew and old plant was replaced.

History

Alderley Edge 
In 1895 Alderley Edge District Council applied for a Provisional Order under the Electric Lighting Acts to generate and supply electricity to the town. This was granted by the Board of Trade and was confirmed by Parliament through the Electric Lighting Orders Confirmation (No. 2) Act 1895 (58 & 59 Vict. c. lxvii). The following year the Provisional Order was transferred to the Alderley and Wilmslow Electric Supply Company Limited. The company, which was registered 23 April 1896, built power stations at Heyes Lane, Alderley Edge and at Wilmslow, Cheshire. The Company supplied electricity to the area prior to the nationalisation of the British electricity industry in 1948.  As a consequence of nationalisation the company was abolished and ownership of its power stations was vested in the British Electricity Authority, and subsequently the Central Electricity Authority and the Central Electricity Generating Board (CEGB). At the same time the electricity distribution and sales responsibilities of the company's electricity undertaking were transferred to the Merseyside & North Wales Electricity Board (MANWEB). In the 1950s the old plant at Alderley Edge was decommissioned and new plant installed. The station was decommissioned in the late 1960s.

Buxton 
Buxton Corporation was granted a Provisional Order to generate and supply electricity in Buxton Derbyshire in 1894. This was put on a statutory basis by the Electric Lighting Orders Confirmation (No. 1) Act 1894 (57 & 58 Vict. c. xlix).  An oil driven plant was built at Ashwood Dale, Buxton and continued to operate until the 1950s when it was replaced. Buxton Corporation's electricity undertaking was abolished by electricity nationalisation in 1948, the power station was vested in the British Electricity Authority, and the distribution and sales functions transferred to MANWEB. The station was decommissioned in the late 1960s.

Macclesfield   
Macclesfield Corporation was granted a Provisional Order to generate and supply electricity in 1901. This was put on a statutory basis by the Electric Lighting Orders Confirmation (No. 5) Act 1901 (1 & 2 Edw. 7 c. cxxxviii). An oil-engine driven plant was built at George Street, Macclesfield, Cheshire. The Provisional Order was transferred to the Electricity Company of Macclesfield Limited  which operated the undertaking until it was abolished by nationalisation of the electricity industry in 1948. The power station was vested in the British Electricity Authority, and the distribution and sales functions of the company were transferred to MANWEB. The plant at the station was scrapped and replaced in the 1950s. The station was decommissioned in the late 1960s.

Following nationalisation the area supplied by the Macclesfield Group became an electricity supply district, covering  with an estimated population of 103,700. It included the Boroughs of Macclesfield and Buxton, and the Districts of Bollington, Wilmslow, Alderley Edge, Hazel Grove, Marple, Whaley Bridge and New Mills.

Equipment specification

Alderley Edge 
By 1923 the generating plant comprised:

 2 × 45 kW reciprocating steam engine driven generators
 1 × 150 kW reciprocating steam engine driven generator
 2 × 125 kW oil fired engine driven generators
 1 × 150 kW oil fired engine driven generator

These machines gave a total generating capacity of 640 kW of direct current.

Electricity supplies to consumers were at 420 & 210 Volt DC.

The steam plant was decommissioned in the 1930s. The original oil fired station was closed on 1 April 1953 and the oil plant removed. It was re-commissioned in December 1954 and comprised:

 2 × 2 MW Mirrlees/Brush diesel engine alternator sets operating at 11 kV, one commissioned in December 1954 and the second in June 1955.
 1 × Davenport cooling tower, capacity 60,000 gallons per hour (273 m3/h), with a cooling range .

Buxton 
By 1923 the generating plant comprised:

 1 × 80 kW gas engine driven generator
 1 × 100 kW gas engine driven generator
 2 × 200 kW gas engine driven generators

These machines gave a total generating capacity of 580 kW of direct current.

Electricity supplies to consumers were at 460 & 230 Volt DC.

The old 570 kW plant was scrapped on 1 April 1953. New plant was commissioned in December 1954. This comprised:

 2 × 2 MW Mirrlees/Brush diesel engine alternator sets operating at 6.6 kV

Macclesfield 
By 1923 the generating plant comprised:

 2 × 135 kW oil fired engine driven generators
 1 × 225 kW oil fired engine driven generator
 2 × 250 kW oil fired engine driven generators
 1 × 350 kW oil fired engine driven generator

These machines gave a total generating capacity of 1,345 kW of direct current.

Electricity supplies to consumers were at 460 & 230 Volt DC.

New plant was commissioned in March 1955. This comprised:

 1 × 2 MW Mirrlees/Brush diesel engine alternator sets operating at 11 kV
 1 × Davenport cooling tower, capacity 30,000  gallons per hour (137 m3/h), cooling range .

Operations

Alderley Edge 
The operating data for the period 1921–23 is given in the table and shows the amount of electricity sold to each type of consumer, the maximum loads and some financial data.
Alderley Edge power station had a maximum load of 461 MW and supplied 32.24 MWh of electricity in 1946.

Operating data for the period 1954–58 was:

The combined performance of the Macclesfield Group power stations for 1961–63 is given below under Macclesfield.

Buxton 
The operating data for the period 1921–23 was:
Buxton power station had a maximum load of 819 MW and supplied 228.57 MWh of electricity in 1946.

Operating data for the period 1955–58 was:

The combined performance of the Macclesfield Group power stations for 1961–63 is given below under Macclesfield.

Macclesfield 
The operating data for the period 1921–23 was:
Macclesfield power station had a maximum load of 1583 MW and supplied 692.45 MWh of electricity in 1946.#eleccomm

Operating data for the period 1954–58 was:

The combined aggregate performance of the Macclesfield Group power stations (Alderley Edge, Buxton and Macclesfield) for 1961–63 was as follows:

Macclesfield Electricity District 
Macclesfield was an electricity supply district, covering  with an estimated population of 103,700. The number of consumers and electricity sold was:

In 1958 the number of units sold to categories of consumers was:

The maximum demand on the district system was 61,350 kW, and the load factor was 32.7%.

Closure 
The Macclesfield group power stations were decommissioned in about 1970.

See also 

 Timeline of the UK electricity supply industry
 List of power stations in England

References 

Demolished power stations in the United Kingdom
Former power stations in England
Power stations in North West England
Buildings and structures in the Borough of Cheshire East